Operation Aloha is the first and only album released by a supergroup of 14 musicians of the same name. The album was conceived by photographer Christopher Wray-McCann who asked some of his musician friends if they wanted to live in a treehouse and record an album in Maui, Hawaii for 30 days. The group did not tour extensively, only appearing live on Last Call with Carson Daly and at The Troubadour to support the album.

Track listing

Alternative versions of the songs "Failure" and "Elephant Pharmacy" are also on Ian Ball's solo album Who Goes There?

Band members
 Dajon Everett (Gomez)
 Ian Ball (Gomez)
 Olly Peacock (Gomez)
 James Valentine (Maroon 5)
 Jesse Carmichael (Maroon 5)
 Sam Farrar (Phantom Planet)
 Fil Krohnengold (All Spots To Black)
 Nadav Kahn (Kahn Brothers)
 Charles Danek
 Mathew Chaney
 Maureen Wray-McCann
 Saam Gabbay
 Will Nash
 Christopher Wray-McCann (Photographer)

References

External links

Myspace Profile

2009 albums